Pietroșița is a commune in Dâmbovița County, Muntenia, Romania with a population of 3,270 people. It is composed of two villages, Dealu Frumos and Pietroșița. The name is derived from the compound Piatra (meaning stone) and șița (meaning slate).

It is served by a direct rail connection to Bucharest and is known for the high quality of its drinking water.

References

Communes in Dâmbovița County
Localities in Muntenia